The Alydar Stakes is an American Thoroughbred horse race held annually in early August at Saratoga Race Course in Saratoga Springs, New York. Made a Listed race in 2019, it is contested on dirt at a distance of a mile and one-eighth. It is open to four-year-old non-winners in the current year of a Sweepstake other than a State-bred event.

Records
Speed record:
 1:47.45 @ 1 miles : Tom's d'Etat (2019)

Most wins:
 2 - Art Collector (2021, 2022)

Most wins by a jockey:
 2 - John Velazquez (2013, 2017)
 2 - Irad Ortiz Jr. (2014, 2016)
 2 - Joel Rosario (2015, 2019)
 2 - Luis Saez (2021, 2022)

Most wins by a trainer:
 2 - Todd A. Pletcherer (2013, 2017)
 2 - Kiaran McLaughlin (2014, 2015)
 2 - William I. Mott (2021, 2022)

Most wins by an owner:
 2 - Bruce Lunsford (2021, 2022)

Winners

References

Horse races in New York (state)
Flat horse races for four-year-olds
Open mile category horse races
Saratoga Race Course
2013 establishments in New York (state)
Recurring sporting events established in 2013